Kalwaria Zebrzydowska Lanckorona railway station is a railway station in the town of Kalwaria Zebrzydowska, in the Lesser Poland Voivodeship, Poland. The station is located on the Skawina–Żywiec railway and Kalwaria Zebrzydowska–Bielsko-Biała railway. The train services are operated by PKP and Przewozy Regionalne.

The name Kalwaria Zebrzydowska Lanckorona is the longest name of a rail station in Poland.

Train services
The station is served by the following services:

Intercity services (IC) Warsaw - Kraków - Zakopane 
Intercity services (IC) Gdynia - Gdańsk - Bydgoszcz - Łódź - Czestochowa — Krakow — Zakopane
Intercity services (IC) Bydgoszcz - Poznań - Leszno - Wrocław - Opole - Rybnik - Bielsko-Biała - Zakopane
Intercity services (IC) Szczecin - Białogard - Szczecinek - Piła - Poznań - Ostrów Wielkopolski - Katowice - Zakopane
Intercity services (TLK) Gdynia Główna — Zakopane 
Regional services (PR) Zakopane - Nowy Targ - Chabówka - Skawina - Kraków Płaszów 
Regional services (PR) Zakopane - Nowy Targ - Chabówka - Skawina - Kraków Główny 
Regional services (PR) Sucha Beskidzka - Kalwaria Zebrzydowska Lanckorona 
Regional services (PR) Sucha Beskidzka - Kalwaria Zebrzydowska Lanckorona - Kraków Główny 
Regional service (PR) Bielsko-Biała Główna — Wadowice - Kraków Główny

References

 This article is based upon a translation of the Polish language version as of November 2016.

Wadowice County
Railway stations in Lesser Poland Voivodeship